The 8th Iowa Cavalry Regiment was a cavalry regiment that served in the Union Army during the American Civil War.

Service
The 8th Iowa Cavalry was mustered into Federal service at Davenport, Iowa, for a three-year enlistment on September 30, 1863.

The regiment was mustered out of Federal service on August 13, 1865.

Total strength and casualties
A total of  1442 men served in the 8th Iowa at one time or another during its existence.
It suffered 15 enlisted men who were killed in action or who died of their wounds and 3 officers and 176 enlisted men who died of disease, for a total of 194 fatalities.

Commanders
Colonel Joseph B. Dorr
Colonel Horatio G. Barner.

See also
List of Iowa Civil War Units
Iowa in the American Civil War

Notes

References
The Civil War Archive

Units and formations of the Union Army from Iowa
1863 establishments in Iowa
Military units and formations established in 1863
Military units and formations disestablished in 1865